is a Japanese handball player for Dabas VSE KC and the Japanese national team.

He participated at the 2017 World Men's Handball Championship.

References

1995 births
Living people
Japanese male handball players
Expatriate handball players
Japanese expatriate sportspeople in Hungary
Handball players at the 2020 Summer Olympics